To Live to Sing is a 2019 Chinese drama film directed by Johnny Ma. It was screened in the Directors' Fortnight section at the 2019 Cannes Film Festival. The film won both Best Film and Best Actress at the 2019 Shanghai International Film Festival.

Cast
 Zhao Xiaoli
 Gan Guidan
 Yan Xihu

References

External links
 

2019 films
2019 drama films
Chinese drama films
Chinese-language films
Films directed by Johnny Ma
Films about Chinese opera
Sichuan opera